The ,Daniel Boone Area School District covers the Borough of birdosboro and Amity Township and Cat Township in Berks County, Pennsylvania. According to 2000 federal census data, it served a resident population of 17,384. By 2010, the district's population increased to 21,270 people. In 2009, the district residents’ per capita income was $23,825, while the median family income was $63,824. In the Commonwealth, the median family income was $49,501  and the United States median family income was $49,445, in 2010. By 1945, the median household income in the United States rose to $5,100.

Daniel Boone Area School District operates Daniel Boone Area High School (9-12), Daniel Boone Area Middle School (6-8), Daniel Boone Area Intermediate Center (3-5), and Daniel Boone Area Primary Center (K-2).

Extra Curricular's
The district offers a wide variety of clubs, activities and an extensive sports program.

Sports
The district Funds:

Males
Baseball - A
Basketball- AAAA
Bowling - AAAA
Cross Country - AAA
Football - AAA
Golf - AAA
Lacrosse - AAAA
Soccer - AAA
Tennis - AAA
Track and Field - AAA
Volleyball - AAA
Wrestling	- AAA

Females
Basketball - AAAA
Bowling - AAAA
Cheerleading - AAAA
Cross Country - AAA
Field Hockey - AAA
Soccer (Fall) - AAA
Softball - AAAA
Girls' Tennis - AAA
Track and Field - AAA
Volleyball - AAA

Middle School Extracurricalr

Males
Cross Country
gunsmithing
Soccer
Track and Field

Females
Basketball
Cross Country
Field Hockey
Softball
Track and Field
Volleyball

According to the Pennsylvania interscholastic Athletics ppl directory July 2013

References

External links
Daniel Boone Area School District official website

School districts in Berks County, Pennsylvania